Match Premier Channel is a Russian sport channel, focused on the Russian Premier League. The channel was formed on March 17, 2006 as "NTV-Plus Nash Futbol" («НТВ-Плюс Наш футбол»). Since July 20, 2012 until August 31, 2015, LIGA TV company was the owner. Since July 12, 2013 until July 27, 2018 the channel was called Nash Football («Наш футбол»), and was part of the NTV Plus network but later acquired by Gazprom Media as part of Match TV Channel (Матч ТВ).

See also 
 Russian Football Union

References

External links 
 

Russian-language television stations
Football in Russia
24-hour television news channels in Russia
Television channels in Russia
Sports television networks in Russia